James's  is a stop on the Luas light-rail tram system in Dublin, Ireland.  It opened in 2004 as a stop on the Red Line.  The stop is located within the grounds of St. James's Hospital, next to the Trinity Centre for Health Sciences.  It also provides access to the National College of Art and Design and Guinness Storehouse.  The stop has two edge platforms, and is of the same design as many Luas stops.  After departing the stop, northbound trams turn right onto James's Street on their way to Connolly or The Point.  Southbound trams continue on their own right of way through the grounds of the hospital, with grass between the tracks, travelling towards Tallaght or Saggart.

The stop is also served by Dublin Bus routes 13, 40, and 123.

References

Luas Red Line stops in Dublin (city)